A time-of-flight (TOF) detector is a particle detector which can discriminate between a lighter and a heavier elementary particle of same momentum using their time of flight between two scintillators. The first of the scintillators activates a clock upon being hit while the other stops the clock upon being hit.

where  is the distance between the scintillators. The approximation is in the relativistic limit at momentum  and  denotes the speed of light in vacuum.

See also
Time-of-flight mass spectrometry

Particle detectors